Tyler Beskorowany (born April 28, 1990) is a Canadian professional ice hockey goaltender who plays for Northern Irish Elite Ice Hockey League (EIHL) side Belfast Giants. He most recently played for EC VSV in the Austrian Hockey League (IceHL). He was selected by the Dallas Stars in the second round (59th overall) of the 2008 NHL Entry Draft.

Playing career
Prior to turning professional, Beskorowany played major junior hockey in the Ontario Hockey League with the Owen Sound Attack and Kingston Frontenacs.

On September 17, 2009, Beskorowany was signed by the Dallas Stars to a three-year entry-level contract. Throughout the duration of his contract, Beskorowany was assigned to American Hockey League and ECHL affiliates, the Texas Stars and Idaho Steelheads.

At the completion of his contract with the Dallas Stars, Beskorowany was not tendered a Qualifying offer and was released as a free agent. On July 24, 2013, he signed a one-year contract with ECHL club, the San Francisco Bulls. However, on January 27, 2014 the San Francisco Bulls announced they were ceasing operations effective immediately, leaving Beskorowany and all players on an ECHL contract with San Francisco as free agents.

He spent the 2014-15 season with Düsseldorfer EG of the German top-flight Deutsche Eishockey Liga (DEL) and was named DEL Goaltender of the Year.

On June 17, 2015, the Springfield Falcons announced they had signed Beskorowany to a one-year AHL deal. Beskorowany began the 2015–16 season with the Falcons before he was loaned to the ECHL with the Norfolk Admirals. Two months into his contract with the Falcons as their third choice keeper, Beskorowany requested a release to return to Germany in agreeing to a deal for the remainder of the year with the Thomas Sabo Ice Tigers on December 2, 2015.

In December 2017, Beskorowany returned to hockey by signing for UK EIHL side Edinburgh Capitals. In June 2018, Beskorowany moved to the Belfast Giants.

In the summer of 2019, Beskorowany moved to HC '05 Banská Bystrica.

In August 2020, Beskorowany signed for Austrian Hockey League (IceHL) side EC VSV. However he departed the club in October 2020 after suffering an injury.

In June 2021, it was announced that Beskorowany would return to the Belfast Giants for the 2021–22 season - two years after he first left the team.

After winning the Elite League title and Challenge Cup in the 2021–22 season, Beskorowany announced his retirement from hockey in July 2022. However, in January 2023 it was announced that he had re-signed for the Belfast Giants.

Awards and honours

References

External links

1990 births
Living people
HC '05 Banská Bystrica players
Belfast Giants players
Canadian ice hockey goaltenders
Dallas Stars draft picks
Düsseldorfer EG players
EC VSV players
Edinburgh Capitals players
Ice hockey people from Ontario
Idaho Steelheads (ECHL) players
Kingston Frontenacs players
Norfolk Admirals (ECHL) players
Nürnberg Ice Tigers players
Orlando Solar Bears (ECHL) players
Owen Sound Attack players
St. John's IceCaps players
San Francisco Bulls players
Sportspeople from Greater Sudbury
Springfield Falcons players
Texas Stars players
Canadian expatriate ice hockey players in Northern Ireland
Canadian expatriate ice hockey players in Scotland
Canadian expatriate ice hockey players in Germany
Canadian expatriate ice hockey players in the United States
Canadian expatriate ice hockey players in Slovakia
Canadian expatriate ice hockey players in Austria